Carlos Felipe Morales Languasco (Puerto Plata, 23 August 1867 – Paris, 1 March 1914) was a Dominican priest, politician and military figure. 

Carlos Morales Languasco was born in Puerto Plata, Dominican Republic on August 23, 1868. He was the son of Isabel Languasco Chevalier (1832–1905), a native of Puerto Plata, and Agustín Morales Robainne (1839–1893), a native of the Danish West Indies. Languasco was the daughter of a Nicolasa Chevalier Bonne, of French descent and native of Puerto Plata, and Agustín Languasco, a North Italian immigrant from the Kingdom of Sardinia-Piedmont. Meanwhile Agustín Morales was the son of Rovisa Rossetta Robainne (1803–1857), a native of Saint Thomas (Danish West Indies), and Agustín Morales Brito (1806—1869), a Spaniard from Lanzarote.

Morales Languasco was ordained presbyter or priest by monsignor Fernando Arturo de Meriño in 1891.

Morales retired from priesthood to engage in politics. He served as the President of Chamber of Deputies of the Dominican Republic in 1901. He served as Governor of Puerto Plata during the presidency of Alejandro Woss y Gil to whom he led a coup on November 23, 1903. He then served as president of the Dominican Republic from November 24, 1903 until his resignation on December 29, 1905. During this period he gave the United States the rights to manage the Customs to pay the debt in which the Dominican Government had been involved since the presidency of Ulises Heureaux. He died in Paris, France on March 1, 1914.

Ancestry

References

Biography at the Enciclopedia Virtual Dominicana

1868 births
1914 deaths
19th-century Roman Catholic priests
20th-century Roman Catholic priests
20th-century Dominican Republic politicians
Presidents of the Chamber of Deputies of the Dominican Republic
Dominican Republic people of Danish descent
Dominican Republic people of French descent
Dominican Republic people of Italian descent
Dominican Republic people of Spanish descent
People from Puerto Plata Province
Presidents of the Dominican Republic
Dominican Republic Roman Catholic priests
White Dominicans